The Braunschweig meteorite is a  meteorite that hit Melverode, a suburb in Braunschweig, Germany, at around 2:05 AM on 23 April 2013.

Composition and classification
The meteorite has been classified as an L6 ordinary chondrite.

Impact
It hit concrete pavement  from Erhard Seemann's front door, breaking into hundreds of fragments upon impact. Many other fragments of the meteorite were found within  from the impact crater by several people.

Reports
A neighbor reported hearing a strong hum and "whoosh" followed by a loud crash at around 2:10 AM, and then found four fragments of the meteorite on his driveway. In Ahlum,  from the impact site, Julian Mascow reported a bright flare approaching from the southeast for 1–2 seconds, with a luminosity "like dawn," before ending in a "short tracer just over his head." He heard a loud explosion about 90 seconds later followed by a rumbling noise. The Technical University of Braunschweig informed expert Rainer Bartoschewitz of the reports, who inspected the site on April 27 and confirmed the meteorite.

References

External links
 

2013 in Germany
April 2013 events in Europe
Meteorites found in Germany
Chondrite meteorites
Meteorite falls
Events in Lower Saxony
2010s in Lower Saxony
Braunschweig
2013 in space